Lumileds is a lighting company that develops, manufactures, and distributes LEDs,  light bulbs, and related products for automotive lighting, general lighting, and specialty lighting. Lumileds operates as a private company, having funds affiliated with Apollo Global Management.

History
Lumileds was formed in November 1999 as a joint venture between Philips Lighting and Agilent Technologies. Upon Philips' acquisition in 2005, Lumileds became a business unit within Philips Lighting and became known as Philips Lumileds Lighting Company. 
 
In March 2015, Lumileds parent company Philips agreed to sell an 80.1 percent stake in the business to the investment fund, Go Scale. In October 2015, Financial Times reported that the Committee on Foreign Investment in the United States (CFIUS) regulatory body may block the $2.9B deal owing to fears of Chinese subversion of the US high-tech sector. The deal was cancelled in January, 2016, due to the CFIUS concerns.  CFIUS concerns were based on transfer of gallium nitride semiconductor technology, which is used in LEDs as well as defense applications.

In December 2016, Philips announced that it has signed an agreement to sell an 80.1% interest in Lumileds to certain funds managed by affiliates of Apollo Global Management. Philips retains the remaining 19.9% interest in Lumileds. The transaction was completed in July 2017, under customary closing conditions, including the relevant regulatory approvals.

IP strategist Keaton Parekh helped separate the intellectual property portfolio after the spin off from Philips.

Products and applications
The company sells products for automotive, illumination and specialty applications, with automotive lighting comprising 60% of its sales in 2015.

In architectural lighting they released the Luxeon C in 2015, a family of high-power LED light sources capable of delivering multiple colors from a single focal length.

Lumileds LEDs are used in the Bridge of Peace, an illuminated pedestrian bridge in Tbilisi, and in the Times Square Ball made by Waterford Crystal.

Patent dispute with Epistar
Lumileds had a history of patent disputes with competitor Epistar over the use of AlInGaP LED technology. However, in September, 2009, Philips Lumileds signed an agreement to license AlInGaP technology to Epistar.

See also

 Epistar
 Cree Inc.
 Nichia

References

External links
 

Manufacturing companies established in 1999
Light-emitting diode manufacturers
Manufacturing companies based in Amsterdam
Dutch brands
1999 establishments in the Netherlands
Companies that filed for Chapter 11 bankruptcy in 2022